Maryna Ivanauna Shkermankova (born 9 April 1990 in Hlybokaye, Belarus) is a weightlifter representing Belarus. She initially won the bronze medal at the 2012 Summer Olympics in the – 69 kg category. In 2016, she was stripped of her Olympic medal after retests of her drug sample tested positive for the steroids stanozolol and turinabol.

References 

1990 births
Living people
Belarusian female weightlifters
Olympic weightlifters of Belarus
Weightlifters at the 2012 Summer Olympics
Belarusian sportspeople in doping cases
Doping cases in weightlifting
Competitors stripped of Summer Olympics medals
People from Hlybokaye
Sportspeople from Vitebsk Region
20th-century Belarusian women
21st-century Belarusian women